The Intrusive Suite of Yosemite Valley (see Yosemite Valley) is one of several intrusive suites in Yosemite National Park. These also include

 Fine Gold Intrusive Suite
 Intrusive Suite of Buena Vista Crest
 Intrusive Suite of Jack Main Canyon
 Intrusive Suite of Merced Peak
 Intrusive Suite of Sonora Pass
 Tuolumne Intrusive Suite

It is an intrusive suite composed mainly of granitic rocks, which near the metasedimentary pendant have locally mingled with granitic to gabbroic compositions.

References

External links and references

 Geology and geochemistry of mafic to felsic plutonic rocks in the Cretaceous intrusive suite of Yosemite Valley, California 

Geology of California
Geology of Yosemite National Park